Microsoft Configuration Manager, formerly Microsoft Endpoint Configuration Manager, System Center Configuration Manager and Systems Management Server (SMS) is a systems management software product developed by Microsoft for managing large groups of computers providing remote control, patch management, software distribution, operating system deployment, and hardware and software inventory.
Configuration Manager supports the Microsoft Windows and Windows Embedded operating systems.  Previous versions also supported macOS (OS X), Linux or UNIX, as well as Windows Phone, Symbian, iOS and Android mobile operating systems.

History
Configuration Manager has evolved since Microsoft originally released it as "Systems Management Server" in 1994. Significant releases include:

 Systems Management Server 1.0, released in 1994 along with Windows NT Server 3.5.  This initial release targeted the management of MS-DOS, Windows for Workgroups, Windows NT, Macintosh, and OS/2 desktops on Windows NT Server, NetWare, LAN Manager, and Pathworks networks.
 Systems Management Server 1.1, released in 1995 to help customers migrate to Windows 95.
 Systems Management Server 1.2, released in 1996 with new remote-control, SNMP, inventory, and network-monitoring capabilities.
 Systems Management Server 2.0, released in 1999 to help with Y2K remediation efforts.
 Systems Management Server 2003, released in 2003 with improved stability, reliability, and software-distribution capabilities.

Microsoft Systems Center product suite
 Configuration Manager 2007, released in 2007 with support for Windows Vista and Windows Server 2008.
 Configuration Manager 2012, released in 2012 with significant changes to application deployment capabilities.
 Configuration Manager Current Branch 1511, released in November 2015 to support Windows 10 and new Windows servicing options.
 Configuration Manager Current Branch 1602, released March 11, 2016. New features include conditional access for PCs, Office 365 Update Management, greater management of mobile devices and of Windows 10.
 Configuration Manager Current Branch 1606, released July 22, 2016.  New features include support for managing new Windows 10 features like Windows Information Protection and Windows Defender Advanced Threat Protection, improved integration with the Windows Store for Business supporting online and offline-licensed apps, and more.
 Configuration Manager Current Branch 1610, released in November 2016 
 Configuration Manager Current Branch 1702, released March 2017      
 Configuration Manager Current Branch 1706, released July 2017       
 Configuration Manager Current Branch 1710, released November 2017          
 Configuration Manager Current Branch 1802, released March 2018                     
 Configuration Manager Current Branch 1806, released July 2018            
 Configuration Manager Current Branch 1810, released December 2018 
 Configuration Manager Current Branch 1902, released March 2019   
 Configuration Manager Current Branch 1906, released July 2019 

Microsoft Endpoint Manager product suite
 Configuration Manager Current Branch 1910, released December 2019 
 Configuration Manager Current Branch 2002, released April 2020 
 Configuration Manager Current Branch 2006, released August 2020 
 Configuration Manager Current Branch 2010, released November 2020 
 Configuration Manager Current Branch 2103, released May 2021 
 Configuration Manager Current Branch 2107, released August 2021
 Configuration Manager Current Branch 2111, released December 2021 
 Configuration Manager Current Branch 2203, released April 2022 

SMS went through three major iterations:
 The 1.x versions of the product defined the scope of control of the management server (the site) in terms of the NT domain being managed.
 With the 2.x versions, that site paradigm switched to a group of subnets to be managed together.
 With SMS 2003 the site could also be defined as one or more Active Directory sites.

The most frequently used feature is a software deployment, which provides installation and updating of Windows Apps, legacy applications, and Operating Systems across a business enterprise.

SMS 2003 saw the introduction of the Advanced Client. The Advanced Client communicates with a more scalable management infrastructure, namely the Management Point. (A Management Point (MP) can manage up to 25000 Advanced Clients.) Microsoft introduced the Advanced Client to provide a solution to the problem where a managed laptop might connect to a corporate network from multiple locations and thus should not always download content from the same place within the enterprise (though it should always receive policy from its own site). When an Advanced Client is within another location (SMS Site), it may use a local distribution point to download or run a program, which can conserve bandwidth across a WAN.

Components 
 Policy Infrastructure
 Service Window Manager
 State System
 Center Configuration Manager Scheduler (CCM Scheduler)
 Center Configuration Manager Configuration Item Software Developers Kit (CCM CI SDK)
 Desired Configuration Management Agent (DCM Agent)
 Desired Configuration Management Reporting (DCM Reporting)
 MTC
 CI Agent
 CI Store
 CI Downloader
 CI Task Manager
 CI State Store
 Content Infrastructure
 Software Distribution
 Reporting
 Software Updates
 Operating System Deployment

Requirements 
The requirements for Configuration Manager are always changing as the system becomes more and more complex. An up-to-date, detailed dive into the requirements can be found on the Microsoft Website Documentation here.

Product branding and naming 
Microsoft Configuration Management has gone through two brand changes. Both resulted in reducing confusion with other initialism as well as including the software in a Microsoft systems management portfolio.
In 2007, System Management Service (SMS) became System Center Configuration Manager (SCCM). This helped avoid confusion with the Short Message Service (SMS) initialism and added the product, along with other system management tools, under a unified System Center brand.
In 2019 Configuration Manager moved to the Microsoft Endpoint Manager suite to better align it with Microsoft Intune and related endpoint management solutions.  This change also helped reduce confusion of the oft used initialism SCCM that is common in other industries such as The Society of Critical Care Medicine (SCCM).

Throughout the life of the product, many acronyms, initialisms, and abbreviations have been used to refer to the software including
 SMS
 SCCM
 CM
 MECM
 MEMCM
 ConfigMgr
 Config Man

However, Microsoft has stated and documented that the official name is one of the following   
 Microsoft Endpoint Configuration Manager
 Configuration Manager
 ConfigMgr

#MEMCM is the semi-official Twitter hastag of the product

See also
 Microsoft Servers 
 Microsoft Endpoint Manager
 Intune
 Microsoft System Center
 Data Protection Manager
 Operations Manager
 Virtual Machine Manager
 Configuration management
 Windows Server Update Services
 SYDI

References

External links
 

Systems Management Server
System administration
Remote administration software
Configuration management